AXN is a pay television channel owned by Sony Pictures Television, which was first launched in September 1997 in Asia. Local versions have since been launched in several parts of the world, including Europe, Asia, and Latin America. 

Funded through advertising and subscription fees, AXN primarily airs action genre and reality programming.

Programming

Italy
 Afterworld
 Andromeda
 Black Sails
 Blood Ties
 Breaking Bad
 Charlie's Angels
 The Closer
 The Collector
 CSI: Cyber
 Damages
 Fear Factor
 .hack//Sign
 Hawaii Five-0
 Hercules: The Legendary Journeys
 Justified
 Kidnapped
 Kung Fu
 MacGyver
 Man's Work
 Michael Hayes
 Mission: Impossible
 Most Shocking
 Murder
 Mutant X
 NCIS: New Orleans
 The Net
 New York Undercover
 Noein
 Odyssey 5
 The Outer Limits
 Quantum Leap
 Painkiller Jane
 Planetes
 Plunkett & Macleane
 Rescue Me
 Ripley's Believe It or Not!
 Scorpion
 Seven Days
 The Shield
 Sleeper Cell
 Sliders
 Stargate Universe
 Starsky & Hutch
 Strong Medicine
 Third Watch
 Ultimate Force
 The Vision of Escaflowne
 Wire in the Blood
 World's Most Amazing Videos

India
 24
 The 4400
 The Agency
 American Ninja Warrior
 Alias
 Beauty & the Beast
 Billions
 Blue Bloods
 Boomtown
 BrainDead
 The Brave
 Breaking Bad
 Bull
 Californication
 Caprica
 Charlie's Angels
 CHOSEN
 Chuck
 Crouching Tiger, Hidden Dragon
 CSI
 CSI: Cyber
 CSI: Miami
 CSI: NY
 Camelot
 Damages
 Dexter
 Doubt
 Elementary
 Extant
 Falling Skies
 The Firm
 Gossip Girl
 The Handmaid's Tale
 Hannibal
 Hawaii Five-0
 House MD
 Incorporated
 Justified
 Leverage
 Little Big Shots
 MacGyver
 Madam Secretary
 Minute to Win It
 NCIS
 NCIS: Los Angeles
 NCIS: New Orleans
 Nip/Tuck
 NUMB3RS
 Nurse Jackie
 Orphan Black
 Penny Dreadful
 Ray Donovan
 The Real Housewives of New York City
 Reckless
 Salvation
 Scorpion
 Seven Types of Ambiguity
 Sex and the City
 Sheena
 The Shield
 Sherlock
 Supernatural
 Teen Wolf
 Top Chef
 Undercover
 Vikings
 V.I.P.
 The Voice
 Under the Dome
 You
 Wipeout
 Zoo

Denmark
 Blue Bloods 
 Scandal 
 Alina’s Roses of Fireweed
 le Palm Guns’ wire
 24
 NUMB3RS
 Alias
 Breaking Bad
 Burn Notice
 Chicago Fire
 Criminal Minds
 CSI: Crime Scene Investigation
 CSI: Cyber
 CSI: Miami
 CSI: New York
 Departure
 Dexter
 Gone
 House of Cards
 The Irish White House
 Law & Order: Criminal Intent
 Major Crimes
 Mentalisten
 Murder In The First
 NCIS
 NCIS: Los Angeles
 NCIS: New Orleans
 Orphan Black
 Salvation
 Scorpion
 The Tudors
 Weeds
 Danish Blossom, O’Her La Soustanne 
 Devious Maids
 Drop Dead Diva 
 Army Wives 
 The Borgias
 Castle
 Damages
 Fairly Legal
 Gossip Girl 
 Law & Order
 Medium
 Missing
 Orange, O’Love y Ogehasta Sunflower
 Penny Dreadful
 Pretty Little Liars
 Private Practice 
 Sanctuary
 Star Trek: Enterprise
 Stargate Universe
 In Plain Sight

Portugal
 CSI: Crime Scene Investigation
 CSI: Miami
 CSI: NY
 NCIS
 In Plain Sight
 Castle
 Leverage
 Memphis Beat
 Law & Order: UK
 The Mentalist
 Criminal Minds
 Perception
 The Borgias
 Once Upon a Time
 Las Vegas
 Missing
 The Firm
 The Pillars of the Earth
 The Mob Doctor
 Sherlock
 Hannibal
 XIII: The Series
 Private
 The Confession
 Alarm für Cobra 11 – Die Autobahnpolizei
 Lasko – Die Faust Gottes
 Cybill
 Homicide: Life on the Street

Turkey
 24
 Alias
 Awake
 The Blacklist
 Blue Bloods
 Bones
 Breaking Bad
 Castle
 The Closer
 Cold Case 
 Criminal Minds
 CSI: Crime Scene Investigation
 CSI: Cyber
 CSI: Miami
 CSI: New York
 Dexter
 Elementary
 Fargo
 The Good Wife
 Hannibal 
 Hawaii Five-0
 Justified
 The Killing
 Law & Order: Special Victims Unit
 Leverage
 MacGyver
 Magnum P.I.
 The Mentalist
 Necessary Roughness
 NCIS
 NCIS: Los Angeles
 NCIS: New Orleans
 Parenthood 
 Ray Donovan
 Rizzoli & Isles 
 Scorpion
 The Shield
 Suits
 Teen Wolf
 True Blood
 Without a Trace

Germany (Sony AXN)
 18 Wheels of Justice
 19-2
 Absentia
 Breaking Bad
 Californication
 Chicago P.D.
 Common Law
 Dexter
 Drei Engel für Charlie
 Elementary
 Flashpoint
 Hannibal
 Hawaii Fünf-Null
 Highlander
 House of Lies
 Hustle
 Kingdom
 Knight Rider (2008)
 Magnum
 Police Rescue – Gefährlicher Einsatz
 Power
 Relic Hunter – Die Schatzjägerin
 Rush
 The Firm
 The District – Einsatz in Washington
 The Shield – Gesetz der Gewalt
 True Justice
 Yellowstone

Channels
There are various local versions of the channel, as listed below:

Operating channels
AXN Adria - Available in Bosnia and Herzegovina, Croatia, North Macedonia, Montenegro, Serbia, and Slovenia.
AXN Asia - Available in Brunei, Hong Kong, People's Republic of China, Cambodia, Indonesia, Laos, Maldives, Myanmar, Macau, Malaysia, Palau, Papua New Guinea, Philippines, Singapore, Sri Lanka, Thailand, Taiwan and Vietnam (sold to KC Global Media) 
AXN Black - Available in Romania, Bulgaria, Poland, Hungary, the Czech Republic and Slovakia.
AXN Brazil - Available in Brazil.
AXN White - Available in Spain, Andorra, Equatorial Guinea, Bulgaria, the Czech Republic, Hungary, Poland, Portugal, Romania and Slovakia. Formerly AXN Crime.
AXN Europe - Available in Bulgaria, the Czech Republic, France, Hungary, Luxembourg, Moldova, Poland, Portugal, Romania, Slovakia and Spain.
Sony AXN - Available in Austria, Germany and Switzerland.
AXN Hungary - Available in Hungary
AXN Middle East - Available in Algeria, Bahrain, Iran, Iraq, Egypt, Kuwait, Lebanon, Qatar, Saudi Arabia, the United Arab Emirates, Israel, Jordan, Qatar, Syria and Yemen
AXN Japan - Available in Japan
AXN Korea - Available in South Korea (sold to KC Global Media) 
AXN Latin America - Available in Mexico, Colombia, Venezuela, Argentina, Chile, Ecuador, Central America, Peru, Bolivia, Paraguay, Uruguay, Jamaica and Dominican Republic.
AXN Portugal - Available in Portugal, Angola, Mozambique
AXN Movies - Available in Portugal, Angola, Mozambique
AXN Spin - Available in Bosnia and Herzegovina, Poland, Romania, Croatia, North Macedonia, Serbia and Slovenia.
AXN Turkey - Available in Turkey.
AXN Mystery - Available in Japan
AXN Now - VOD service
AXN Pacific - Available in Australia, New Zealand, Tuvalu

Discontinued channels
AXN Beyond - Broadcast in Philippines, Hong Kong, Singapore, Indonesia, and Thailand. The channel was replaced with BeTV on 2 April 2012
AXN Crime - Was available in Poland, Hungary, Romania, Bulgaria, The Czech Republic and Slovakia.
AXN Black Hungary - Broadcast in Hungary
AXN Italy - Broadcast in Italy.
AXN Netherlands - Broadcast in Netherlands from 2012 to 2020. 
AXN Israel - Broadcast in Israel. (closed January 14, 2009)
AXN White Hungary - Broadcast in Hungary.
AXN Sci Fi - Broadcast in Italy, Poland, Hungary, Romania, Bulgaria, Czech Republic and Slovakia
AXN India - broadcast in India
AXN Black Portugal - Broadcast in Portugal

As part of a brand licensing agreement with Sony, Canadian broadcaster Hollywood Suite launched an AXN-branded movie network in 2012 known as AXN Movies, a re-branding of its network Hollywood Storm. The channel was discontinued on November 3, 2015, as part of the re-formatting of Hollywood Suite's channels to use decade-based formats.

References

External links
 Official hub site, with links to the local versions
 AXN White hub site, with links to the local versions
 AXN Black hub site, with links to the local versions 
 AXN Spin hub site, with links to the local versions 
 Sony Entertainment Television hub site, with links to the local versions
 SET Asia
 Sony Television Asia

 
Sony Pictures Television
Television channels and stations established in 1997